was the ninth daimyō of Matsumae Domain in Ezo-chi, Japan, in the latter half of the Edo period. He held this position from 1792 to 1807 and again from 1821 until his death in 1833; in the years between, the bakufu exerted direct control over the whole of Ezo, while the Matsumae clan were relocated to Yanagawa Domain. He was successor to his father Matsumae Michihiro and succeeded in turn by his grandson Matsumae Yoshihiro.

Names

Biography
Matsumae Akihiro was born in An'ei 4 (1775), the eldest son of Matsumae Michihiro, eighth daimyō of Matsumae Domain. In Kansei 4 (1792), his father stepping aside, he became the ninth daimyō. Alerted to the question of the northern frontier by the arrival of Russian and British ships (under Adam Laxman and William Robert Broughton respectively), in 1799 the bakufu assumed direct control over eastern Ezo. His domain thus greatly reduced, Matsumae Akihiro was compensated with the grant of lands in Musashi Province, in what is now Kuki, Saitama Prefecture, to the value of five thousand koku. In Kyōwa 2 (1802), the bakufu decided to take permanent control of eastern Ezo, establishing the Hakodate bugyō, the Matsumae clan receiving a gift of 3,500 ryō of gold in return.

In Bunka 2 (1805), learning that Nikolai Rezanov, on his return from Nagasaki, had met with officials of the Matsumae Domain and a number of Ainu, the bakufu sent out  to inspect the state of affairs in Matsumae and western Ezo. Taken ill upon his arrival in Matsumae that winter, he returned to Edo, journeying north again in 1806, his tour of inspection taking him from Matsumae to Sōya, before he returned to Edo once more. Concluding that the Matsumae Domain was unable to protect the norther borders, in 1807 the bakufu decided Matsumae Akihiro should hand back Matsumae and western Ezo, so as directly to control the entirety of Ezo. Matsumae Akihiro was consequently transferred to Yanagawa Domain in Mutsu province, in what is now Date, Fukushima Prefecture, the fief valued at 9,000 koku.

In Bunsei 4 (1821), Matsumae Akihiro was returned to his former fief in Ezo. The following year, he founded the  han school. Passing away in Tenpō 4 (1833), he was succeeded by his grandson Matsumae Yoshihiro, his son Chikahiro having died in 1827; another of Matsumae Akihiro's fourteen children, by more than one lady, Matsumae Takahiro, would later become the twelfth daimyō.

See also
 Sakoku
 Kakizaki Hakyō
 Vasily Golovnin
 Matsuura Takeshirō

References

Daimyo
Matsumae clan
1775 births
1833 deaths